Benthoclionella is a genus of sea snails, marine gastropod mollusks in the family Clavatulidae.

Species
Species within the genus Benthoclionella include:
 Benthoclionella jenneri Kilburn, 1974

References

  Kilburn R.N. (1974). Taxonomic notes on South African marine Mollusca (3): Gastropoda: Prosobranchia, with descriptions of new taxa of Naticidae, Fasciolariidae, Magilidae, Volutomitridae and Turridae. Annals of the Natal Museum. 22: 187-220.

External links

 
Clavatulidae
Monotypic gastropod genera